Bulbophyllum adelphidium is a species of orchid in the genus Bulbophyllum. The species was originally described by J.J. Vermeulen i 1993

References

adelphidium
Plants described in 1993